Jorge Rodríguez (born 9 March 1945) is a Spanish alpine skier. He competed at the 1964 Winter Olympics and the 1968 Winter Olympics.

References

1945 births
Living people
Spanish male alpine skiers
Olympic alpine skiers of Spain
Alpine skiers at the 1964 Winter Olympics
Alpine skiers at the 1968 Winter Olympics
Sportspeople from Barcelona
20th-century Spanish people